Erol Tuncer (born 1938) is a Turkish engineer, bureaucrat and politician who was a member of the Republican People's Party. He briefly served as the minister of construction and settlement in 1977. He was a member of the Turkish Parliament for two terms between 1973 and 1980.

Biography
Tuncer was born in Bayburt in 1938. He is a graduate of Istanbul Technical University where he received a degree in civil engineering. He worked at the public institutions as an engineer and bureaucrat until 1973. He was appointed general director of the natural disasters agency. He was elected as a deputy of Gümüşhane for the Republican People's Party in 1973. He was again elected to the Parliament from Gümüşhane in the 1977 election and served there until the 1980 military coup. Tuncer was appointed minister of construction and settlement to the 40th government led by Prime Minister Bülent Ecevit on 21 June 1977. The cabinet was dissolved on 21 July 1977.

Following the military coup Tuncer actively involved in the establishment of new social democrat parties and in the reopening of the Republican People's Party which had been banned by the military council. He unsuccessfully ran for chairmanship of the party when it was reestablished on 9 September 1992. Next year Tuncer and his colleagues founded an Ankara-based think tank entitled TESAV (Toplumsal Ekonomik Siyasal Araştırmalar Vakfı; Social Economic Political Research Foundation) of which he has been the president since then. In 2003 Tuncer again ran for the chairmanship of the Republican People's party against Deniz Baykal. 

Tuncer has published many books on politics in Turkey and the Republican People's Party.

References

20th-century Turkish engineers
21st-century Turkish engineers
1938 births
Living people
Government ministers of Turkey
Istanbul Technical University alumni
People from Bayburt
Republican People's Party (Turkey) politicians
Members of the 15th Parliament of Turkey
Members of the 16th Parliament of Turkey
Members of the 40th government of Turkey
Turkish civil engineers